The 2003 Pop Secret Microwave Popcorn 400 was the 35th stock car race of the 2003 NASCAR Winston Cup Series season and the 29th and to date, final iteration of the event. The race was held on Sunday, November 9, 2003, before a crowd of 60,000 in Rockingham, North Carolina, at North Carolina Speedway, a  permanent high-banked racetrack. The race took the scheduled 393 laps to complete. At race's end, Evernham Motorsports driver Bill Elliott charged to the front after starting from the rear to win his 44th and to date, final career NASCAR Winston Cup Series win and his first and only win of the season. Meanwhile, fourth-place finisher, Roush Racing driver Matt Kenseth, would lock up the championship, clinching the championship by points to win his first and to date, only NASCAR Winston Cup Series championship. To fill out the podium, Jimmie Johnson of Hendrick Motorsports and Jeremy Mayfield of Evernham Motorsports would finish second and third, respectively.

Background 

North Carolina Speedway was opened as a flat, one-mile oval on October 31, 1965. In 1969, the track was extensively reconfigured to a high-banked, D-shaped oval just over one mile in length. In 1997, North Carolina Motor Speedway merged with Penske Motorsports, and was renamed North Carolina Speedway. Shortly thereafter, the infield was reconfigured, and competition on the infield road course, mostly by the SCCA, was discontinued. Currently, the track is home to the Fast Track High Performance Driving School.

Entry list

Practice 
Originally, three practices were going to be held, with one on Friday and two on Saturday. However, rain would cancel one session on Saturday and delay the second Saturday session.

First practice 
The first practice session was held on Friday, November 7, at 11:20 AM EST, and would last for 2 hours.

Second and final practice 
The second and final practice session, sometimes referred to as Happy Hour, was held on Saturday, November 8, at approximately 12:10 PM EST, and would last for 45 minutes.

Qualifying 
Qualifying was held on Friday, November 7, at 3:05 PM EST. Each driver would have two laps to set a fastest time; the fastest of the two would count as their official qualifying lap. Positions 1-36 would be decided on time, while positions 37-43 would be based on provisionals. Six spots are awarded by the use of provisionals based on owner's points. The seventh is awarded to a past champion who has not otherwise qualified for the race. If no past champ needs the provisional, the next team in the owner points will be awarded a provisional.

Three drivers would fail to qualify: Hermie Sadler, Tim Sauter, and Rich Bickle.

Full qualifying results

Race results

References 

2003 NASCAR Winston Cup Series
NASCAR races at Rockingham Speedway
November 2003 sports events in the United States
2003 in sports in North Carolina